Harold Vincent Olson (born January 19, 1938) is a former American football offensive tackle in the American Football League for the Buffalo Bills and the Denver Broncos. Olson made the AFL Pro Bowl team in 1961 and was named first-team All-Pro in 1962.

Olson played college football at Clemson University, including playing in the 1959 Sugar Bowl against Louisiana State University. Olson was inducted into the Clemson Athletic Hall of Fame in 2010.

See also
Other American Football League players

References

1938 births
Living people
Sportspeople from Asheville, North Carolina
Players of American football from North Carolina
American football offensive tackles
Clemson Tigers football players
Buffalo Bills players
Denver Broncos (AFL) players
American Football League All-Star players
American Football League players